The 2021 S5000 Tasman Series, known by its sponsored identity the Shannons S5000 Tasman Series, was the 13th season of the revived Tasman Series that was last held in 1975, and the first Tasman Series using S5000 machinery and therefore the S5000 moniker. It was held in late November and early December 2021. Aaron Cameron, driving for Garry Rogers Motorsport, claimed the Tasman Cup, first awarded in 1964.

Teams and drivers 
All teams competed with identical Rogers AF01/V8 single-seater racecars, Ligier/Onroak chassis powered by Ford Coyote V8 engines.

 Volante Rosso Racing were planning an entry, but these plans did not come to fruition.

Calendar
Originally, the second S5000 season was planned to start in September 2021, running until early 2022. After the cancellation of the 2021 Australian Grand Prix, it was decided to instead revive the Tasman Series. After the cancellation of the Gold Coast 500, the calendar saw the Tasman Series held over two rounds, the first one at Sydney Motorsports Park and the second one over the Bathurst meeting, which was now a six-day expanded Bathurst 1000 event.

The second S5000 season started in January 2022.

Race results

Drivers' standings 
Each of the two rounds started with a qualifying session, awarding ten points for pole position down to one point for 10th. The grid of the first race was based on this qualifying result, with 30 points being awarded to the winner. The middle races of each round reversed the qualifying results, with the top 75% reversed for R2 and R5 and the top 50% reversed for R6 respectively, all awarding 20 points to the winner. The last race of each weekend marked the most important one, with a grid based on points scored over all previous weekend sessions and 60 points on offer for the winner.

Notes

References

See also 

 2021 S5000 Australian Drivers' Championship

S5000
S5000
Tasman Series seasons